Homo floresiensis  also known as "Flores Man"; nicknamed "Hobbit") is an extinct species of small archaic human that inhabited the island of Flores, Indonesia, until the arrival of modern humans about 50,000 years ago.

Partial skeletons of at least nine individuals have been recovered, including one complete skull, referred to as "LB1".

This hominin was at first considered remarkable for its survival until relatively recent times, initially thought to be only 12,000 years ago. However, more extensive stratigraphic and chronological work has pushed the dating of the most recent evidence of its existence back to 50,000 years ago. The Homo floresiensis skeletal material is now dated from 60,000 to 100,000 years ago; stone tools recovered alongside the skeletal remains were from archaeological horizons ranging from 50,000 to 190,000 years ago.

Specimens

Discovery

The first specimens were discovered on the Indonesian island of Flores on 2 September 2003 by a joint Australian-Indonesian team of archaeologists looking for evidence of the original human migration of modern humans from Asia to Australia. They instead recovered a nearly complete, small-statured skeleton, LB1, in the Liang Bua cave, and subsequent excavations in 2003 and 2004 recovered seven additional skeletons, initially dated from 38,000 to 13,000 years ago.

In 2004, a separate species Homo floresiensis was named and described by Peter Brown et al., with LB1 as the holotype. A tooth, LB2, was referred to the species. LB1 is a fairly complete skeleton, including a nearly complete skull, which belonged to a 30-year-old female, and has been nicknamed "Little Lady of Flores" or "Flo". An arm bone provisionally assigned to H. floresiensis, specimen LB3, is about 74,000 years old. The specimens are not fossilized and have been described as having "the consistency of wet blotting paper". Once exposed, the bones had to be left to dry before they could be dug up. The discoverers proposed that a variety of features, both primitive and derived, identify these individuals as belonging to a new species. Based on previous date estimates, the discoverers also proposed that H. floresiensis lived contemporaneously with modern humans on Flores. Before publication, the discoverers were considering placing LB1 into her own genus, Sundanthropus floresianus, but reviewers of the article recommended that, despite her size, she should be placed in the genus Homo.

In 2009, additional finds were reported, increasing the minimum number of individuals represented by bones to fourteen. In 2015, teeth were referred to a fifteenth individual, LB15.

Stone implements of a size considered appropriate to these small humans are also widely present in the cave. The implements are at horizons initially dated to 95,000 to 13,000 years ago. Modern humans reached the region by around 50,000 years ago, by which time H. floresiensis is thought to have gone extinct. Comparisons of the stone artifacts with those made by modern humans in East Timor indicate many technological similarities.

Scandal over specimen damage
The fossils are property of the Indonesian state. In early December 2004, Indonesian paleoanthropologist Teuku Jacob removed most of the remains from their repository, Jakarta's National Research Centre of Archaeology, without the permission of one of the institute's directors, Raden Panji Soejono, and kept them for three months. Professor Richard Roberts of the University of Wollongong in Australia and other anthropologists expressed the fear that important scientific evidence would be sequestered by a small group of scientists who neither allowed access by other scientists nor published their own research. Jacob returned the remains on 23 February 2005 with portions severely damaged and missing two leg bones.

Press reports thus described the condition of the returned remains: "[including] long, deep cuts marking the lower edge of the Hobbit's jaw on both sides, said to be caused by a knife used to cut away the rubber mould ... the chin of a second Hobbit jaw was snapped off and glued back together. Whoever was responsible misaligned the pieces and put them at an incorrect angle ... The pelvis was smashed, destroying details that reveal body shape, gait and evolutionary history.", causing the discovery team leader Morwood to remark, "It's sickening; Jacob was greedy and acted totally irresponsibly."

Jacob, however, denied any wrongdoing. He stated that the damages occurred during transport from Yogyakarta back to Jakarta despite the claimed physical evidence that the jawbone had been broken while making a mould of the bones.

In 2005, Indonesian officials forbade access to the cave. Some news media, such as the BBC, expressed the opinion that the restriction was to protect Jacob, who was considered "Indonesia's king of palaeoanthropology", from being proven wrong. Scientists were allowed to return to the cave in 2007, shortly after Jacob's death.

Classification

Phylogeny and evolution
Because of the deep neighbouring Lombok Strait, Flores remained an isolated island during episodes of low sea level. Therefore, the ancestors of H. floresiensis could only have reached the island by oceanic dispersal, most likely by rafting. The oldest stone tools on Flores are over 1 million years old. Stone artifacts are absent from sites over 1.27 million years old, suggesting that the ancestors of H. floresiensis arrived after this time. They date to about 700,000 years ago and are noted by Australian archaeologist Gerrit van den Bergh for being even smaller than the later fossils. Based on these, he suggested that H. floresiensis derived from a population of H. erectus and rapidly shrank.

Two orthopedic studies published in 2007 reported that the wrist bones were more similar to those of chimpanzees and Australopithecus than to modern humans. Another 2007 study of the bones and joints of the arm, shoulder, and lower limbs also concluded that H. floresiensis was more similar to early humans and other apes than modern humans. In 2008, South African palaeoanthropologist Lee Rogers Berger and colleagues described the earliest human remains from the Palau Archipelago, and noted several parallels to H. floresiensis; they suggested supposedly diagnostic traits of H. floresiensis were instead a result of insular dwarfism of an H. erectus population.

A 2009 cladistic analysis concluded H. floresiensis branched off very early from the modern human line, either shortly before or shortly after the evolution of H. habilis 1.96–1.66million years ago. In 2009, American anthropologist William Jungers and colleagues found that the foot of H. floresiensis has several primitive characteristics, and that they could be the descendants of a species much earlier than H. erectus. A 2015 Bayesian analysis found greatest similarity with Australopithecus sediba, Homo habilis and the primitive H. erectus georgicus, raising the possibility that the ancestors of H. floresiensis left Africa before the appearance of H. erectus, and were possibly even the first hominins to do so. However, H. floresiensis has several dental similarities to H. erectus, which supports H. erectus as the ancestor species, a suggestion supported by a later 2022 study including some of the same authors.
 
A phylogenetic analysis published in 2017 suggests that H. floresiensis was descended from the same (presumably australopithecine) ancestor as H. habilis, making it a sister taxon to H. habilis. H. floresiensis would thus represent a hitherto unknown and very early migration out of Africa. A similar conclusion was suggested in a 2018 study dating stone artefacts found at Shangchen, central China, to 2.1 million years ago.

DNA extraction attempt
In 2006, two teams attempted to extract DNA from a tooth discovered in 2003, but both teams were unsuccessful. It has been suggested that this happened because the dentine was targeted; new research suggests that the cementum has higher concentrations of DNA. Moreover, the heat generated by the high speed of the drill bit may have denatured the DNA.

Congenital disorder hypotheses
The small brain size of H. floresiensis at 417 cc prompted hypotheses that the specimens were simply H. sapiens with a birth defect, rather than the result of neurological reorganisation. These claims have subsequently been rejected.

Microcephaly

Prior to Jacob's removal of the fossils, American neuroanthropologist Dean Falk and her colleagues performed a CT scan of the LB1 skull and a virtual endocast, and concluded that the brainpan was neither that of a pygmy nor an individual with a malformed skull and brain. In response, American neurologist Jochen Weber and colleagues compared the computer model skull with microcephalic human skulls, and found that the skull size of LB1 falls in the middle of the size range of the human samples, and is not inconsistent with microcephaly. In 2006, American biologist Robert Martin and colleagues also concluded that the skull was probably microcephalic, arguing that the brain is far too small to be a separate dwarf species; he said that, if it were, the 400-cubic-centimeter brain would indicate a creature only  in height, one third the length of the discovered skeleton.

A 2006 study stated that LB1 probably descended from a pygmy population of modern humans, but herself shows signs of microcephaly, and other specimens from the cave show small stature but not microcephaly.

In 2005, the original discoverers of H. floresiensis, after unearthing more specimens, countered that the skeptics had mistakenly attributed the height of H. floresiensis to microcephaly. Falk stated that Martin's assertions were unsubstantiated. In 2006, Australian palaeoanthropologist Debbie Argue and colleagues also concluded that the finds are indeed a new species. In 2007, Falk found that H. floresiensis brains were similar in shape to modern humans, and the frontal and temporal lobes were well-developed, which would not have been the case were they microcephalic.

In 2008, Greek palaeontologist George Lyras and colleagues said that LB1 falls outside the range of variation for human microcephalic skulls. However, a 2013 comparison of the LB1 endocast to a set of 100 normocephalic and 17 microcephalic endocasts showed that there is a wide variation in microcephalic brain shape ratios and that in these ratios the group as such is not clearly distinct from normocephalics. The LB1 brain shape nevertheless aligns slightly better with the microcephalic sample, with the shape at the extreme edge of the normocephalic group. A 2016 pathological analysis of LB1's skull revealed no pathologies nor evidence of microcephaly, and concluded that LB1 is a separate species.

Laron syndrome
A 2007 study postulated that the skeletons were those of humans who suffered from Laron syndrome, which was first reported in 1966, and is most common in inbreeding populations, which may have been the scenario on the small island. It causes a short stature and small skull, and many conditions seen in Laron syndrome patients are also exhibited in H. floresiensis. The estimated height of LB1 is at the lower end of the average for afflicted human women, but the endocranial volume is much smaller than anything exhibited in Laron syndrome patients. DNA analysis would be required to support this theory.

Congenital iodine deficiency syndrome
 
In 2008 Australian researcher Peter Obendorf—who studies congenital iodine deficiency syndrome—and colleagues suggested that LB1 and LB6 suffered from myxoedematous (ME) congenital iodine deficiency syndrome resulting from congenital hypothyroidism (underactive thyroid), and that they were part of an affected population of H. sapiens on the island. Congenital iodine deficiency syndrome, caused by iodine deficiency, is expressed by small bodies and reduced brain size (but ME causes less motor and mental disablement than other forms of congenital iodine deficiency syndrome), and is a form of dwarfism still found in the local Indonesian population. They said that various features of H. floresiensis are diagnostic characteristics, such as enlarged pituitary fossa, unusually straight and untwisted humeral heads, relatively thick limbs, double rooted premolar, and primitive wrist morphology.

However, Falk's scans of LB1's pituitary fossa show that it is not larger than usual. Also, in 2009, anthropologists Colin Groves and Catharine FitzGerald compared the Flores bones with those of ten people who had had cretinism, and found no overlap. Obendorf and colleagues rejected Groves and FitzGerald's argument the following year. A 2012 study similar to Groves and FitzGeralds' also found no evidence of congenital iodine deficiency syndrome.

Down syndrome
In 2014, physical anthropologist Maciej Henneberg and colleagues claimed that LB1 suffered from Down syndrome, and that the remains of other individuals at the Flores site were merely normal modern humans. However, there are a number of characteristics shared by both LB1 and LB6 as well as other known early humans and absent in H. sapiens, such as the lack of a chin. In 2016, a comparative study concluded that LB1 did not exhibit a sufficient number of Down syndrome characteristics to support a diagnosis.

Anatomy 

The most important and obvious identifying features of Homo floresiensis are its small body and small cranial capacity. Brown and Morwood also identified a number of additional, less obvious features that might distinguish LB1 from modern H. sapiens, including the form of the teeth, the absence of a chin, and a lesser torsion in the lower end of the humerus (upper arm bone). Each of these putative distinguishing features has been heavily scrutinized by the scientific community, with different research groups reaching differing conclusions as to whether these features support the original designation of a new species, or whether they identify LB1 as a severely pathological H. sapiens.

A 2015 study of the dental morphology of forty teeth of H. floresiensis compared to 450 teeth of living and extinct human species, states that they had "primitive canine-premolar and advanced molar morphologies," which is unique among hominins.

The discovery of additional partial skeletons has verified the existence of some features found in LB1, such as the lack of a chin, but Jacob and other research teams argue that these features do not distinguish LB1 from local modern humans. Lyras et al. have asserted, based on 3D-morphometrics, that the skull of LB1 differs significantly from all H. sapiens skulls, including those of small-bodied individuals and microcephalics, and is more similar to the skull of Homo erectus. Ian Tattersall argues that the species is wrongly classified as Homo floresiensis as it is far too archaic to assign to the genus Homo.

Size
LB1's height is estimated to have been . The height of a second skeleton, LB8, has been estimated at  based on tibial length. LB1's body mass is estimated to have been . LB1 and LB8 are also somewhat smaller than the australopithecines, such as Lucy, from three million years ago, not previously thought to have expanded beyond Africa. Thus, LB1 and LB8 may be the shortest and smallest members of the extended human group discovered thus far.

Their short stature was likely due to insular dwarfism, where size decreases as a response to fewer resources in an island ecosystem. In 2006, Indonesian palaeoanthropologist Teuku Jacob and colleagues said that LB1 has a similar stature to the Rampasasa pygmies who inhabit the island, and that size can vary substantially in pygmy populations. The Rampasasa pygmies are completely unrelated to H. floresiensis.

Aside from smaller body size, the specimens seem to otherwise resemble H. erectus, a species known to have been living in Southeast Asia at times coincident with earlier finds purported to be of H. floresiensis.

Brain

In addition to a small body size, H. floresiensis had a remarkably small brain size. LB1's brain size is half that of its presumed immediate ancestor, H. erectus. The brain-to-body mass ratio of LB1 lies between that of H. erectus and the great apes. Such a reduction is likely due to insular dwarfism, and a 2009 study found that the reduction in brain size of extinct pygmy hippopotamuses in Madagascar compared with their living relatives is proportionally greater than the reduction in body size, and similar to the reduction in brain size of H. floresiensis compared with H. erectus.

Smaller size does not appear to have affected mental faculties, as Brodmann area 10 on the prefrontal cortex, which is associated with cognition, is about the same size as that of modern humans. H. floresiensis is also associated with evidence for advanced behaviours, such as the use of fire, butchering, and stone tool manufacturing.

Limbs
The angle of humeral torsion is much less than in modern humans. The humeral head of modern humans is twisted between 145 and 165 degrees to the plane of the elbow joint, whereas it is 120 degrees in H. floresiensis. This may have provided an advantage when arm-swinging, and, in tandem with the unusual morphology of the shoulder girdle and short clavicle, would have displaced the shoulders slightly forward into an almost shrugging position. The shrugging position would have compensated for the lower range of motion in the arm, allowing for similar maneuverability in the elbows as modern humans. The wrist bones are similar to those of apes and Australopithecus, significantly different from those of modern humans, lacking features which evolved at least 800,000 years ago.

The leg bones are more robust than those of modern humans. The feet were unusually flat and long in relation with the rest of the body. As a result, when walking, they would have had to have bent the knees further back than modern humans do. This caused a high-stepping gait and low walking speed. The toes had an unusual shape and the big toe was very short.

Culture

The cave yielded a great quantity, over ten thousand, of stone artefacts, mainly lithic flakes, surprising considering H. floresiensis's incredibly small brain size. This has led some researchers to theorize that H. floresiensis inherited their tool-making ability from H. erectus. Points, perforators, blades, and microblades were associated with remains of the extinct elephant Stegodon, and were probably hafted into barbs to sink into the elephant. This indicates the inhabitants were targeting juvenile Stegodon. While it was initially suggested to have been capable of using fire, the supporting evidence for this claim was later found to be unreliable.

Extinction

The youngest H. floresiensis bone remains in the cave date to 60,000 years ago, and the youngest stone tools to 50,000 years ago. The previous estimate of 12,000 BCE was due to an undetected unconformity in the cave stratigraphy. Their disappearance is close to the time that modern humans reached the area, suggesting that the initial encounter caused or contributed to their extinction. This would be consistent with the disappearance of Homo neanderthalensis from Europe about 40,000 years ago, within 5,000 years after the arrival of modern humans there, and other anthropogenic extinctions.

Paleoecology 
During the late Early Pleistocene-Late Pleistocene before the arrival of Homo sapiens, Flores exhibited a depauperate ecosystem with relatively few terrestrial vetebrate species, including the dwarf proboscidean (elephant relative) Stegodon florensis, a variety of rats (Murinae), ranging up to the size of rabbits in the largest genera such as Papagomys and Spelaeomys, the Komodo dragon and another smaller monitor lizard (Varanus hooijeri), with birds including a giant stork (Leptoptilos robustus) and a vulture (Trigonoceps).

"Hobbit" nickname

Homo floresiensis was swiftly nicknamed "the hobbit" by the discoverers, after the fictional race popularized in J. R. R. Tolkien's book The Hobbit, and some of the discoverers suggested naming the species H. hobbitus.

In October 2012, a New Zealand scientist due to give a public lecture on Homo floresiensis was told by the Tolkien Estate that he was not allowed to use the word "hobbit" in promoting the lecture.

In 2012, the American film studio The Asylum, which produces low-budget "mockbuster" films, planned to release a movie entitled Age of the Hobbits depicting a "peace-loving" community of H.floresiensis "enslaved by the Java Men, a race of flesh-eating dragon-riders." The film was intended to piggyback on the success of Peter Jackson's film The Hobbit: An Unexpected Journey. The film was blocked from release due to a legal dispute about using the word "hobbit." The Asylum argued that the film did not violate the Tolkien copyright because the film was about H.floresiensis, "uniformly referred to as 'Hobbits' in the scientific community." The film was later retitled Clash of the Empires.

See also
 
 
 
 Ebu gogo – small humanoid creatures in the folklore of Flores
 Orang Pendak – short humanoid creatures said to inhabit remote, mountainous forests on the islands of Sumatra and Borneo

References

Citation

Sources 

 
 
 
 
 
 
 
 Knepper, Gert M. (2019): Floresmens - Het leven van Theo Verhoeven, missionaris en archeoloog.  (Bookscout, Soest, The Netherlands) (= a biography of the discoverer of the Liang Bua, in Dutch)

External links 

 Hawks, John. Blog of a professor of anthropology who closely follows this topic.
 
 
 
 
 Scientific American Interview with Professor Brown 27 October 2004
 National Geographic News article on H. floresiensis
 Homo floresiensis - The Smithsonian Institution's Human Origins Program
  Blog commentary on the Obendorf paper.
 Washington University in St. Louis Virtual Endocasts of the "Hobbit" – Electronic Radiology Laboratory
 Nova's Alien from Earth documentary website, complete program available through Watch Online feature
 Hobbits in the Haystack: Homo floresiensis and Human Evolutions – Turkhana Basin Institute presentment at the Seventh Stony Brook Human Evolution Symposium
 Human Timeline (Interactive) – Smithsonian, National Museum of Natural History (August 2016).

2003 archaeological discoveries
Early species of Homo
Pleistocene primates
Prehistoric Indonesia
Fossil taxa described in 2004
Flores Island (Indonesia)
Extinct animals of Indonesia
Pleistocene mammals of Asia